Rick Miles is a Canadian politician from New Brunswick. As a member of the Liberal Party, Miles represented the constituency of Fredericton-Silverwood in the Legislative Assembly from 2006 to 2010.

Biography 
A former member of the Canadian Forces, Miles was a businessman in Fredericton prior to entering politics. In the 2006 general election, Miles defeated former Brad Green, a former Progressive Conservative MLA and cabinet minister Brad Green.

On November 28, 2006, he was elected caucus chair for his Liberal Party. On July 24, 2009, he was added to the province's cabinet as Minister of Environment under premier Shawn Graham. 

Miles lost his bid for re-election in the 2010 general election to Progressive Conservative candidate Brian Macdonald. In 2012, an extended conflict of interest probe into Miles ultimately concluded with the provincial conflict-of-interest commissioner declining to recommend a further investigation.

References

External links
New Brunswick Liberal Party: Rick Miles

New Brunswick Liberal Association MLAs
Living people
Members of the Executive Council of New Brunswick
Businesspeople from New Brunswick
Politicians from Fredericton
Year of birth missing (living people)
21st-century Canadian politicians